Giovanni Gasperini (born March 6, 1886, date of death unknown) was an Italian gymnast who competed in the 1908 Summer Olympics. In 1908 he finished sixth with the Italian team in the team competition.

References

External links
 

1886 births
Year of death missing
Italian male artistic gymnasts
Olympic gymnasts of Italy
Gymnasts at the 1908 Summer Olympics